Moredun Creek is a river of the state of New South Wales in Australia.

See also
List of rivers of Australia

References

External links
 

Rivers of New South Wales
Murray-Darling basin
Northern Tablelands